Humanoids from the Deep is a 1996 American science fiction horror film. It was a remake of Humanoids from the Deep and was part of Roger Corman Presents.

Plot
The United States Army conducts experiments on death row inmates in an attempt to create the perfect amphibious soldier and the resulting man/fish hybrids escape to the open ocean. Over the next few days, several people are killed by being pulled into the sea and drowned.

In the nearby town of Harbor Shores, canning company Canco Industries is under fire from local environmentalists for dumping toxic chemicals into the harbor. When a Canco employee dies in an explosion, Kim Parker, whose father Wade works for Canco, alerts the Coast Guard. That night, Kim goes skinny-dipping with her friends and all but one are pulled under, where the humanoids keep the female victims in giant cocoons to use for mating purposes.

Wade heads to the Police Station to bail out Matt, the lone survivor. who insists they were attacked by a monster. After Canco operatives attempt to kill Matt, he and Wade meet with genetic scientist Dr. Drake who tells them the truth about the Army program. Several more attacks follow and a local woman gives birth to a humanoid, which escapes into a storm drain.

When the Humanoids attack a fair at the docks, a group tracks it back to the underwater cave where the Humanoids have their nest. After a long fight, the lair is blown up with explosives. The next day, all the victims are given pregnancy tests. All come out negative, except for Dr. Drake, who goes into labor while in her car, suggesting the threat is not over.

Cast
Emma Samms as Dr. Drake
Robert Carradine as Wade Parker
Justin Walker as Matt
Mark Rolston as Bill Taylor
Danielle Weeks as Kim Parker
Clint Howard as Deputy
Kaz Garas as Sheriff Barnes
Warren Burton as Major Knapp
Bert Remsen as Duffy the Coroner
Barry Nolan as Male Reporter #1
Barabra Niven as Fran Taylor
Season Hubley as Timmy's mother
Greg Travis as Porter
Walton Goggins as Rod

Reception
The Movie holds a 20% rating on Rotten Tomatoes.

References

External links

Humanoids from the Deep at Letterbox DVD

1996 films
Films produced by Roger Corman
American science fiction television films
American horror television films
American science fiction horror films
1990s science fiction horror films
1990s English-language films
1990s American films